Chapter XI of the United Nations Charter defines a non-self-governing territory (NSGT) as a territory "whose people have not yet attained a full measure of self-government". In practice, an NSGT is a territory deemed by the United Nations General Assembly (UNGA) to be "non-self-governing". Chapter XI of the UN Charter also includes a "Declaration on Non-Self-Governing Territories" that the interests of the occupants of dependent territories are paramount and requires member states of the United Nations in control of such territories to submit annual information reports concerning the development of those territories. Since 1946, the UNGA has maintained a list of non-self governing territories under member states' control. Since its inception, dozens of territories have been removed from the list, typically when they attained independence or internal self-government, while other territories have been added as new administering countries joined the United Nations or the General Assembly reassessed the status of certain territories.

Since 1961 the list has been maintained by the Special Committee on Decolonization.

History
Chapter XI of the UN Charter contains a Declaration Concerning Non-Self-Governing Territories. Article 73(e) requires UN member states to report to the United Nations annually on the development of NSGTs under their control. From the initial reports provided by eight member states (Australia, Belgium, Denmark, France, the Netherlands, New Zealand, the United Kingdom and the United States), a list was compiled in 1946 listing 72 NSGTs. In several instances, administering states were later allowed to remove dependent territories from the list, either unilaterally (as in the case of French overseas territories such as French Polynesia), or by a vote of the General Assembly (as in the cases of Puerto Rico, Greenland, the Netherlands Antilles and Suriname).

The list draws its origins from the period of colonialism and the Charter's concept of non-self-governing territories. As an increasing number of formerly colonized countries became UN members, the General Assembly increasingly asserted its authority to place additional territories on the list and repeatedly declared that only the General Assembly had the authority to authorize a territory's being removed from the list upon attainment of any status other than full independence. For example, when Portugal joined the United Nations it contended that it did not control any non-self-governing territory, claiming that areas such as Angola and Mozambique were an integral part of the Portuguese state, but the General Assembly rejected this position. Similarly, Western Sahara was added in 1963 when it was a Spanish colony. As with Namibia, which was seen, due to its former status as a League of Nations mandate territory, as a vestige of German colonial legacy in Africa, until it was removed in 1990 upon its independence. A set of criteria for determining whether a territory is to be considered "non-self-governing" was established in General Assembly Resolution 1541 (XV) of 1960. Also in 1960, the General Assembly adopted Resolution 1514 (XV), promulgating the "Declaration on the Granting of Independence to Colonial Countries and Peoples", which declared that all remaining non-self-governing territories and trust territories were entitled to self-determination and independence. The following year, the General Assembly established the Special Committee on the Situation with Regard to the Implementation of the Declaration on the Granting of Independence to Colonial Countries and Peoples (sometimes referred to as the Special Committee on Decolonization, or the "Committee of 24" because for much of its history the committee was composed of 24 members), which reviews the situation in non-self-governing territories each year and reports to the General Assembly. A revised list in 1963 listed 64 NSGTs.

Resolutions adopted

1946
 UNGA Resolution 64(I) regarding the Establishment of the Trusteeship Council.
 UNGA Resolution 66(I) regarding Transmission of information under Article 73 e of the Charter.

1947
 UNGA Resolution 142(II) regarding Standard form for the guidance of Members in the preparation of information to be transmitted under Article 73 e of the Charter.
 UNGA Resolution 143(II) regarding Supplemental documents relating to information transmitted under Article 73 e of the Charter.
 UNGA Resolution 144(II) regarding Voluntary transmission of information regarding the development of self-governing institutions in the Non-Self-Governing Territories.
 UNGA Resolution 145(II) regarding Collaboration of the specialized agencies in regard to Article 73 e of the Charter.
 UNGA Resolution 146(II) regarding Creation of a special committee on information transmitted under Article 73 e of the Charter.

1960
 UNGA Resolution 1514 (XV) Declaration on the granting of independence to colonial countries and peoples.
 UNGA regarding Principles which should guide members in determining whether or an obligation exists to transmit the information called for under Article 73e of the Charter.

1961
 UNGA Resolution 1654 (XVI) regarding the situation with regard to the implementation of the Declaration on the granting of independence to colonial countries and peoples.

1966
 International Covenant on Economic, Social and Cultural Rights adopted by the UNGA on 16 December 1966.
 International Covenant on Civil and Political Rights adopted by the UNGA on 19 December 1966.

1990–2000
 UNGA Resolution A/RES/43/45 regarding Implementation of the Declaration on the Granting of Independence to Colonial Countries and Peoples.
 UNGA Resolution A/RES/43/46 regarding Dissemination of information on decolonization.
 UNGA Resolution A/RES/43/47 regarding International Decade for the Eradication of Colonialism.

2001–2010
 UNGA Resolution 55/145 regarding Dissemination of information on decolonization.
 UNGA Resolution 55/146 regarding 2nd International Decade for the Eradication of Colonialism.
 UNGA Resolution 55/147 regarding Implementation of the Declaration on the Granting of Independence to Colonial Countries and Peoples.
 United Nations Economic and Social Council (ECOSOC) Resolution 2007/25 regarding Support to Non-Self-Governing Territories by the specialized agencies and international institutions associated with the United Nations.

2011–present
 UNGA Resolution 65/116 regarding Dissemination of information on decolonization.
 UNGA Resolution 65/117 regarding Implementation of the Declaration on the Granting of Independence to Colonial Countries and Peoples.
 UNGA Resolution 65/118 regarding Fiftieth anniversary of the Declaration on the Granting of Independence to Colonial Countries and Peoples.
 UNGA Resolution 65/119 regarding 3rd International Decade for the Eradication of Colonialism.

Criticism
The list remains controversial in some countries for various reasons:

Referendums
One reason for controversy is that the list includes some dependencies that have democratically chosen to maintain their current status, or have had a referendum in which local government requirements were not met regarding the number of votes required to support a change of status or the number of voters participating (e.g., in the United States Virgin Islands).

Falkland Islands
The Falkland Islands is a British Overseas Territory with a population of 2,500 people and an autonomous government, that is also claimed by Argentina due to an inherited historical colonial claim to the islands by Spain. In March 2013, the Falkland Islands government organised a referendum on the status of the territory. With a 92% turnout, 99.7% of Falkland Islands voters voted to maintain the status quo, with only three islanders (0.2%) favouring a change.

Gibraltar
Gibraltar is largely a self-governing British territory on the tip of the Iberian Peninsula with a population of about 30,000 people, whose territory is claimed by Spain. It continues to be listed as an NSGT though its residents expressed a preference in two referendums to retain the status quo. In 1967, they were asked whether to retain their current status or to become part of Spain. The status quo was favoured by 12,138 votes to 44. In 2002, a proposal for a joint British–Spanish administration of the territory was voted down by 17,900 votes to 187. (The "no" vote accounted for more than 85% of Gibraltar's entire electorate). The United Nations did not recognise either referendum, with the 1967 referendum being declared in contravention of previous UN resolutions. The Spanish government does not recognize any right of the current Gibraltar inhabitants to self-determination, on the grounds that they are not the original population of the territory, but residents transferred by the colonial power, the United Kingdom.

Tokelau
The territory of Tokelau divides political opinion in New Zealand. In response to attempts at decolonizing Tokelau, New Zealand journalist Michael Field wrote in 2004: "The UN ... is anxious to rid the world of the last remaining vestiges of colonialism by the end of the decade. It has a list of 16 territories around the world, virtually none of which wants to be independent to any degree." Field further notes that Patuki Isaako, who was head of Tokelau's government at the time of a UN seminar on decolonization in 2004, informed the United Nations that his country had no wish to be decolonized, and that Tokelauans had opposed the idea of decolonization ever since the first visit by UN officials in 1976.

In 2006, a UN-supervised referendum on decolonization was held in Tokelau, where 60.07% of voters supported the offer of self-government. However, the terms of the referendum required a two-thirds majority to vote in favor of self-government. A second referendum was held in 2007, in which 64.40% of Tokelauans supported self-government, falling short of the two-thirds majority by 16 votes. This led New Zealand politician and former diplomat John Hayes, on behalf of the National Party, to state that "Tokelau did the right thing to resist pressure from [the New Zealand government] and the United Nations to pursue self-government". In May 2008, the United Nations' Secretary General Ban Ki-moon urged colonial powers "to complete the decolonization process in every one of the remaining 16 Non-Self-Governing Territories". This led the New Zealand Herald to comment that the United Nations was "apparently frustrated by two failed attempts to get Tokelau to vote for independence from New Zealand".

Viability
A lack of population and landmass is an issue for at least one territory included on the list: the British overseas territory Pitcairn Islands, which has a population of less than 50 descended primarily from indigenous Polynesians and mutineers from the HMS Bounty. Regardless, the territory's colonial status was disputed during the 2004 sexual assault trial where the seven defendants – comprising a third of the adult male population – unsuccessfully argued that the islanders had rejected British control ever since the 1789 mutiny and, as a result, British criminal law did not apply to them. Four other territories – Tokelau, Montserrat, the Falkland Islands and Saint Helena – are also less populous than any current UN member state.

In addition, some territories are financially dependent on their administering state.

Completely autonomous dependencies

Another criticism is that a number of the listed territories, such as Bermuda (see Politics of Bermuda), the Falkland Islands and Gibraltar, consider themselves completely autonomous and self-governing, with the "administering power" retaining limited oversight over matters such as defence and diplomacy.  In past years, there were ongoing disputes between some administering powers and the Decolonization Committee over whether territories such as pre-independence Brunei and the West Indies Associated States should still be considered "non-self-governing", particularly in instances where the administering country was prepared to grant full independence whenever the territory requested it. These disputes became moot as those territories eventually received full independence.

Removed under other circumstances

Territories that have achieved a status described by the administering countries as internally self-governing – such as Puerto Rico, the Netherlands Antilles, and the Cook Islands – have been removed from the list by vote of the General Assembly, often under pressure of the administering countries.

Some territories that have been annexed and incorporated into the legal framework of the controlling state (such as the overseas regions of France) are considered by the UN to have been decolonized, since they then no longer constitute "non-self-governing" entities; their populations are assumed to have agreed to merge with the former parent state. However, in 1961, the General Assembly voted to end this treatment for the "overseas provinces" of Portugal such as Angola and Mozambique, which were active focus of United Nations attention until they attained independence in the mid-1970s.

Territories have also been removed for other reasons. In 1972, for example, Hong Kong (then administered by the United Kingdom) and Macau (then administered by Portugal) were removed from the list at the request of the People's Republic of China, which had just been recognized as holding China's seat at the United Nations due to the PRC's belief that their status should be resolved by bilateral negotiations.

Change of status
On 2 December 1986, New Caledonia, an overseas territory of France, was reinstated on the list of non-self-governing territories, an action to which France objected. Within France it has had the status of a collectivité sui generis, or a one-of-a-kind community, since 1999. Under the 1998 Nouméa Accord, its Territorial Congress had the right to call for three referendums on independence between 2014 and 2018. The first referendum was held on 4 November 2018 (56.4% against independence), the second referendum on 4 October 2020 (53.26% against independence), and the third referundum on 12 December 2021 (96.50% against independence). While in all three the independence was rejected, the result of the third referendum stems from the boycott by the pro-independence Kanak community in the context of the COVID-19 pandemic in New Caledonia.

French Polynesia was also reinstated on the list on 17 May 2013, in somewhat contentious circumstances. Having been re-elected President of French Polynesia in 2011 (leader of local government), Oscar Temaru asked for it to be re-inscribed on the list; it had been removed in 1947. (French Polynesia is categorised by France as an overseas country, in recognition of its self-governing status.) During the year 2012, Oscar Temaru engaged in intense lobbying with the micro-states of Oceania, many of which, the Solomon Islands, Nauru and Tuvalu, submitted to the UN General Assembly a draft of a resolution to affirm "the inalienable right of the population of French Polynesia to self-determination and independence".

On 5 May 2013, Temaru's Union for Democracy party lost the legislative election to Gaston Flosse's pro-autonomy but anti-independence Tahoera'a Huiraatira party; obtaining only 11 seats against the party of Gaston Flosse, with 38 seats, and the autonomist party A Ti'a Porinetia with 8 seats.

At this stage, the United Nations General Assembly was due to discuss French Polynesia's re-inscription on the list twelve days later, in accordance with a motion tabled by Solomon Islands, Tuvalu and Nauru. On 16 May, the Assembly of French Polynesia, with its new anti-independence majority, adopted a motion asking the United Nations not to restore the country to the list. On 17 May, despite French Polynesia's and France's opposition, the country was restored to the list of non-self-governing territories. Temaru was present for the vote, on the final day of his mandate as President. The United Nations affirmed "the inalienable right of the people of French Polynesia to self-determination and independence".

A few hours before the UN review of the resolution, during its first meeting, the new Territorial Assembly adopted by 46 votes to 10 a "resolution" expressing the desire of Polynesians to maintain their autonomy within the French Republic. In spite of this resolution adopted by the parties representing 70% of the Polynesian voters, the UN General Assembly inscribed French Polynesia on the list of the territories to be decolonized during its plenary assembly of 17 May 2013. France did not take part in this session while the United States, Germany, the Netherlands and the United Kingdom disassociated themselves from this resolution.

List not complete

Also controversial are the criteria set down in 1960 to 1961 by the United Nations General Assembly Resolution 1514 (XV), United Nations General Assembly Resolution 1541 (XV), Principle 12 of the Annex, and United Nations General Assembly Resolution 1654 (XVI) which only focused on colonies of the Western world, namely Australia, Belgium, Denmark, France, Italy, Netherlands, New Zealand, Portugal, South Africa, Spain, the United Kingdom, and the United States. This list of administering states was not expanded afterwards.

Nevertheless, some of the 111 members who joined the UN after 1960 gained independence from countries not covered by Resolution 1541 and were themselves not classified as "Non-Self-Governing Territories" by the UN. Of these that joined the UN between 1960 and 2008, 11 were independent before 1960 and 71 were included on the list (some as a group). Twenty new UN countries resulted from breakup of Second World states and of Yugoslavia: six were part of Yugoslavia, two were part of Czechoslovakia, and 12 were part of the Soviet Union (Ukraine and Belarus already had UN seats before the dissolution of the USSR, whose seat was reused by the Russian Federation without acceding anew). Out of the other nine, seven (mostly Arab) were colonies or protectorates of the "Western" countries, and one each was a non-self-governing part of Ethiopia (later independent Eritrea) and Pakistan (East Pakistan, later independent Bangladesh). Territories like Tibet (administered by China) and Siberia (or parts thereof; administered by the Soviet Union, later by Russia) have never been on the list. Western New Guinea (also known as West Papua), which was ceded to Indonesia, is also not on the list as well as Sarawak and Sabah, which were handed to Malaya during its territorial expansion through the formation of Malaysia in 1963. In 2018, the government of Vanuatu started seeking international support to have West Papua added to the list in 2019.

After the revocation of Norfolk Island's self-governing status by the Australian government in 2015, an island community group requested the UN add the island to the list of non-self-governing territories.

Current entries

The following 17 territories are currently included in the list.

Notes

Former entries
The following territories were originally listed by UN General Assembly Resolution 66 (I) of 14 December 1946 as Trust and Non-Self-Governing Territory. The dates show the year of independence or other change in a territory's status which led to their removal from the list, after which information was no longer submitted to the United Nations.

Change in status by administering state

Joined another state

Independence

See also
 Colony
 Autonomous administrative division
 Dependent territory
 Independence referendum
 List of active separatist movements recognized by intergovernmental organizations
 List of sovereign states
 List of states with limited recognition
 List of territories governed by the United Nations
 Lists of active separatist movements
 Timeline of national independence
 United Nations General Assembly Resolution 1514 (XV)
 United Nations General Assembly Resolution 1541 (XV)
 United Nations General Assembly Resolution 1654 (XVI)
 United Nations trust territories
 Unrepresented Nations and Peoples Organization

References

External links
 The United Nations and Decolonization
 United Nations Trusteeship Council
 Non-Self-Governing Territories, listed by the United Nations General Assembly
 List of former Trust and Non-Self-Governing Territories, listed by United Nations
 United Nations and Decolonization – Committee of 24 – Resumed session, Monday, 13 June 2011 
 The Countries of the World - Appendix: Dependencies or Not?

Self-governance
Decolonization
History of colonialism
United Nations documents
1946 documents
1946 in international relations
Dependent territories